The Crosby by-election was held on 12 November 1953.  It was held due to the incumbent Conservative MP, Malcolm Bullock resigning his seat.  The by-election was won by the Conservative candidate Graham Page.

References

Politics of the Metropolitan Borough of Sefton
1953 elections in the United Kingdom
1953 in England
1950s in Lancashire
By-elections to the Parliament of the United Kingdom in Lancashire constituencies
By-elections to the Parliament of the United Kingdom in Merseyside constituencies
Crosby, Merseyside